Mark W. Grinstaff (born  May 23, 1965) is a Distinguished Professor of translational research, Professor of biomedical engineering, chemistry, materials science, engineering and medicine, at Boston University, director of the National Institutes of Health's T32 Program in Biomaterials, Director of Nanotechnology Innovation Center, and Associate Director for Engineering and Science at the BU Cancer Center.

Early life and education
Grinstaff was born on May 23, 1965 in Texas.  He attended Redlands High School in Redlands, California and completed his undergraduate studies at Occidental College. During his first year at Oxy, he worked at the hummingbird section of a museum while simultaneously studying the kinetics of Friedel-Crafts chloromethylation reactions in the laboratory of Franklin DeHaan. He later worked as a chemistry teaching assistant. During his junior year at Oxy, he decided to pursue chemistry over medicine. He obtained his degree in 1987.

In 1992, Grinstaff earned his doctorate from the University of Illinois at Urbana–Champaign, under the mentorship of Kenneth S. Suslick. While at UIUC he studied sonochemistry and reported one of the first synthetic methods to metal nanoparticles. His thesis focussed on the use of sound waves to make amorphous iron and protein-microsphere materials. For his postdoctoral work, he joined Harry B. Gray's laboratory at the California Institute of Technology where he conducted research on electron transfer chemistry in proteins and the mechanism of alkane hydroxylation using iron porphyrins and oxygen.

Career
Grinstaff served as a faculty member at Duke University from 1996 to 2002. During this time, he was part of the Pharmacology Training Grant Program and the Center for Cellular and Biosurface Engineering. He was also an assistant professor of ophthalmology at Duke University Hospital (1999-2002).

In 2003, Grinstaff relocated to Boston University as part of the recruitment activities associated with the Whitaker Foundation Leadership Award granted to the Department of Biomedical Engineering. He joined Boston University as an associate professor with joint appointments in the Boston University College of Engineering and Boston University College of Arts and Sciences, and subsequently with an appointment at Boston University School of Medicine. In 2004, he served as a faculty member of the Boston University Center for Nanoscience and Nanobiotechnology, becoming the director in 2014.

In 2015, Grinstaff obtained a grant from Bill & Melinda Gates Foundation to develop the self-lubricating condom. Under his watch, four successful biotech companies have emerged: AcuityBio, Affinergy, Articular Biosciences and HyperBranch Medical Technology. Additionally, Grinstaff co-founded five companies and is the inventor of four products by Adherus Surgical Sealants and OcuSeal.

Grinstaff serves on an advisory board of the Syracuse Biomaterials Institute.

In 2001, Grinstaff wrote Proceedings from the Workshop on Nanoscience for the Soldier of which he was also principal investigator.

Awards and honors
Nobel Laureate Signature Award from the American Chemical Society (1994)
PEW Award (1999)
Edward M. Kennedy Award for Healthcare Innovation (2008)
Fellow of the AIMBE (2010)
Charter Fellow of the National Academy of Inventors (2012)
Charles DeLisi Award and Lecture (2015)

References

External links

1969 births
Living people
Occidental College alumni
University of Illinois Urbana-Champaign alumni
Duke University faculty
Boston University faculty
National Institutes of Health faculty
Fellows of the American Institute for Medical and Biological Engineering
People from Texas